Gandomzar (also Romanized as Gandomzār) is a village in Tashan Rural District, Riz District, Jam County, Bushehr Province, Iran. At the 2006 census, its population was 359, in 83 families.

References 

Populated places in Jam County